The European Science Foundation (ESF) is an association of 11 member organizations devoted to scientific research in 8 European countries. ESF is an independent, non-governmental, non-profit organisation that promotes the highest quality science in Europe. It was established in 1974 and its offices are located in Strasbourg, France (headquarters).

ESF Member Organisations are research-performing and research-funding organisations, academies and learned societies across Europe.

After four decades of success in stimulating European research through its networking, ESF undertook a re-alignment and re-calibration of its strategic vision and focus. The launch of its Expert division "Science Connect" beginning of 2017 marks the next phase of its evolution and has been born out of a deep understanding of the science landscape, funding context and the needs of the research community.

Past Activities

Up to 2015 ESF provided a platform for research scoping, planning and networking on a European and global scale for ESF member organisations. ESF activities were organised around three operational bases: strategy, synergy and management.  In line with its then mission and strategic plan, the European Science Foundation ran programmes in science; programmes to enhance science synergy such as research networking programmes and collaborative research projects for European scientists; along with activities dedicated to science management, such as providing administrative services to independent scientific committees and other organisations.

ESF-EUROHORCs - The Funding Gap

In June 2008, ESF in collaboration with EUROHORCs (European Heads of Research Councils) published a policy briefing ‘The EUROHORCs and ESF Vision on a Globally Competitive ERA and their Road Map for Actions to Help Build it’, detailing essential requirements to build a globally competitive European Research Area within the next five to ten years. At the time, EUROHORCs used the European Science Foundation as an implementation agency. Unfortunately, in 2014 this instrument disappeared from the European landscape and has not been replaced by any other funding mechanism.

A change of focus
ESF has recently changed its scope of work. ESF has closed its traditional research support activities (European Collaborative Research Projects, Exploratory Workshops, Research Networking Programmes, etc.) and is focused now on supporting the scientific community through scientific-support services delivered by its Expert division Science Connect.

Structure

ESF is structured as follows:

 Governing bodies
 Science Connect Division
 Community of Experts
 Expert Boards

Governing bodies

The annual assembly is the highest level decision making body of the ESF. It elects the ESF president, the Executive Board, ratifies the budget and accounts and admits new members. The assembly delegates are appointed by ESF member organisations.

The Executive Board sets and direct the overall strategy of the ESF and coordinates the relations with EU and other institutions. The Executive Board consists of the ESF president and 3 to 8 member organisations. The Executive Board meets twice a year.

The President officially represents the ESF to the public and in relations with other national or international organisations.

The Chief Executive is responsible for the implementation of the strategy and policy set by the Executive Board, for administration of the ESF office and its finance and for ensuring the execution of the decision of the assembly and the Governing Council.

Science Connect Division

Science Connect is ESF's Expert services division dedicated to support scientific decision-making through a range of science-support services, such as Grant Evaluation, Career Tracking, coordination of EU-funded Projects and the hosting of scientific platforms and Expert Boards.

Community of Experts

ESF’s Community of Experts is a quality driven network of international recognized experts that covers the full spectrum of the scientific landscape (Humanities, Economics and Social Sciences, Physics, Chemistry, Mathematics and Engineering Sciences, Earth and Environmental Sciences, Life and Biomedical Sciences). Its role is to sustain scientific collaboration, support excellence in research grant peer-review and proposal evaluation across all scientific disciplines.

ESF’s Community of Experts comprises two colleges: 
 The College of Review Panel Members.  Review Panel Members have a broad expertise in several scientific disciplines and their mission is to build consensus during the evaluation of research proposals. 
 The College of Expert Reviewers.  Expert Reviewers are scientists specialized in a specific scientific domain and are in charge of assessing and evaluating several types of proposals such as fellowship applications and research projects.

Expert Boards

Since 1974 ESF has set up and hosted expert boards and committees in several scientific domains. These include space sciences; radio-astronomy frequencies; nuclear physics; marine and polar sciences; and materials science.  At present ESF hosts the following Expert Boards:

European Space Sciences Committee (ESSC)

Established in 1974, the ESSC provides unbiased, expert advice to the space scientific community including but not limited to the European Space Agency, the European Commission, EU national space agencies. Over the years, the ESSC has become the reference body in Europe for independent scientific advice on space matters and a key partner for international research collaboration.

Nuclear Physics European Collaboration Committee (NuPECC)

NuPECC’s aim is to strengthen European collaboration in nuclear physics through the definition of a network of complementary facilities within Europe. NuPECC issues recommendations on the development, organisation and support of European nuclear physics and particular projects.

Committee on Radio Astronomy Frequencies (CRAF)

Established in 1988, CRAF represents all the major radio astronomical observatories in Europe.  CRAF initiates and encourages scientific studies aimed at reducing radio astronomy interference at source and the effects of interference. Throughout the years CRAF has become an active voice in Europe and engages with other groups of radio astronomers in discussions with international organisations that decide on the use of radio spectrum.

ESF Member Organisations

Belgium
Fonds de la Recherche Scientifique - FNRS (F.R.S.–FNRS) (Fund for Scientific Research - FNRS (F.R.S.–FNRS))

Bulgaria
Българска академия на науките (BAS) (Bulgarian Academy of Sciences)
Научни изследвания (National Science Fund of Bulgaria)

France

Institut Français de Recherche pour l’Exploitation de la Mer (IFREMER)(French Research Institute for Exploitation of the Sea)
EuroScience (EuroScience)
Core Technologies for Life Sciences (CTLS)

Hungary

Magyar Tudományos Akadémia (MTA) (Hungarian Academy of Sciences)
Luxembourg

 Fonds National de la Recherche (FNR)

Romania
Consiliul Național al Cercetării Științifice (National Council for Scientific Research -CNCS)

Serbia

Српска академија наука и уметности (САНУ) (Serbian Academy of Sciences and Arts)

Turkey

Türkiye Bilimsel ve Teknolojik Araştırma Kurumu (TÜBITAK) (Scientific and Technological Research Council of Turkey)

ESF Presidents
 1974-1979 Brian Flowers
 1980-1984 Hubert Curien
 1985-1990 Eugen Seibold
 1991-1993 Umberto Colombo
 1994-1999 Sir Dai Rees
 2000-2005 Reinders van Duinen
 2006-2011 Ian Halliday
 2012-2015 Pär Omling
 2016-April 2020: Martin Hynes
April 2020 to date: Véronique Halloin

ESF Secretaries General and Chief Executives
 1974-1979 Friedrich Schneider
 1980-1986 John Goormaghtigh
 1986-1993 Michael Posner
 1991-1993 Umberto Colombo
 1993-1998 Peter Fricker
 1998-2003 Enric Banda
 2004-2007 Bertil Anderson
 2007 John Marks
 2008-2011 Marja Makarow
 2012-2015 Martin Hynes
 2016-June 2019: Jean-Claude Worms 
July 2019 to date: Nicolas Walter

Notes and references

External links 
 

International scientific organizations based in Europe
1974 establishments in Europe
Organizations based in Strasbourg
Organizations established in 1974